Alina Obidniak (29 June 1931 – 29 October 2021) was a Polish theatre director and actress.

Life
Graduate of acting at the Ludwik Solski Academy of Dramatic Arts in Kraków, and film directing at the National Film School in Łódź and Gerasimov Institute of Cinematography in Moscow in the class of Alexander Dovzhenko.

Obidniak was an artistic director of the Wojciech Bogusławski Theatre in Kalisz (1964-1970) and Cyprian Kamil Norwid Theatre in Jelenia Góra (1973-1988, 2000), where she invited many renowned theatre directors including Krystian Lupa, Henryk Tomaszewski, Adam Hanuszkiewicz and Jean-Marie Pradier. In 1978 theatre critics awarded the Norwid Theatre at Théâtre des Nations Festival in Caracas. In 1983 she organised an early Festival of Street Theatre in Jelenia Góra.

Since the 1950s, she has been a close friend and confidant of fellow theatre director Jerzy Grotowski. In 1995, Obidniak received the title of Polish "Woman of Europe" from European Commission.

References 

1931 births
2021 deaths
Polish theatre directors
People from Krosno